Mitchell N. Berman is an American legal scholar. He serves as the Leon Meltzer Professor of Law at the University of Pennsylvania Law School and, in addition, is also a professor of philosophy. He is also the Co-Director of the Institute for Law & Philosophy at the university.

Biography

Berman attended Harvard University (A.B. 1988), the University of Michigan Law School (J.D. 1993), and the University of Michigan (M.A. 1994). In 1994 to 1995 he was a law clerk to James Dickson Phillips Jr., senior circuit judge of the U.S. Court of Appeals for the Fourth Circuit.

Berman is the Leon Meltzer Professor of Law at the University of Pennsylvania Law School, and Professor of Philosophy. He is also the Co-Director of the Institute for Law & Philosophy. Earlier in his career he was the University of Texas at Austin School of Law Richard Dale Endowed Chair in Law.

Among his many articles are "Our Principled Constitution," 166 U. PA. L. REV. 1325 (2018), "The Tragedy of Justice Scalia," 115 MICH. L. REV. 783 (2017), and "Judge Posner’s Simple Law," 113 MICH. L. REV. 777 (2015).

References 

University of Michigan Law School alumni
University of Pennsylvania Law School faculty
University of Michigan alumni
Living people
Law clerks
Harvard University alumni
Year of birth missing (living people)
Philosophers of law
University of Texas at Austin faculty